Meridian Creek is a stream in North Slope Borough, Alaska, in the United States. It is a tributary of the Colville River.

Meridian Creek was so named from the fact its course is roughly parallel with the 160th meridian west.

See also
List of rivers of Alaska

References

Rivers of North Slope Borough, Alaska
Rivers of Alaska